"I'm Feeling You" is a song recorded by Santana with The Wreckers (Michelle Branch and Jessica Harp) for Santana's 2005 album All That I Am. The song was written and produced by Kara DioGuardi and John Shanks, with Branch credited as a co-writer at the label's request. "I'm Feeling You" was Santana's second collaboration with Branch, the first being "The Game of Love" (2002).

An accompanying music video directed by The Malloys showed Branch and Carlos Santana singing onstage of a party, with Jessica Harp singing background. The single reached number fifty-five on the U.S. Billboard Hot 100 and performed best on adult contemporary radio formats, reaching numbers five and six on the Billboard Adult Contemporary and Adult Top 40 charts, respectively.

Background
On a message posted to her message board on 6 December 2005, Branch expresses her dissatisfaction with being associated with the record. She asserts that she was "pressured" by her record company, Maverick Records, to sing on the track, with Jessica Harp being similarly pushed into it so that Maverick could promote Branch and Harp's country music duo, The Wreckers. Branch also claims that she did not do any writing for the song, asserting that her name in the writing credits was used by John Shanks as a "bargaining tool."

Critical reception
David Browne of Entertainment Weekly described parent album All That I Am as "stupendously pedestrian" in the outlet's review of the album and described "I'm Feeling You" specifically as "desperate-housewife pop." Mark Kemp of Paste similarly derided the "messy" formula of the album, and wrote that listeners "won't be feelin' the first single, a gooey pop duet with Michelle Branch called "I'm Feeling You.""

Charts

Weekly charts

Year-end charts

References

2005 singles
Santana (band) songs
Jessica Harp songs
Michelle Branch songs
The Wreckers songs
Song recordings produced by John Shanks
Songs written by Kara DioGuardi
Songs written by John Shanks
Songs written by Michelle Branch
Music videos directed by The Malloys
2005 songs
Arista Records singles
Maverick Records singles
Song recordings produced by Kara DioGuardi